Following international norms, road signs in Nepal are controlled by the Nepali Department of Roads and are heavily influenced by those used in the United Kingdom.

Nepal drives on the left.

Regulatory signs

Warning signs

Information signs

Additional signs

References

Nepal
Road transport in Nepal